The 2006 UAW-Ford 500 was a stock car race that took place on October 8, 2006. The 38th annual running of the event, it was held at Talladega Superspeedway in Talladega, Alabama, before 160,000 spectators; the 188-lap race was the 30th in the 2006 NASCAR Nextel Cup Series and the fourth in the ten-race, season-ending Chase for the Nextel Cup. Brian Vickers of Hendrick Motorsports won the race; Kasey Kahne finished second, and Kurt Busch came in third.

David Gilliland, who had the pole position, was passed immediately by teammate Dale Jarrett. The race lead changed 63 times, with Dale Earnhardt Jr. leading for the most laps (37). Earnhardt was leading on the final lap when he and Jimmie Johnson crashed after Vickers made contact with Johnson's right rear quarter panel, causing the race to end under caution flag conditions. Vickers (Johnson's teammate) was determined the race winner by NASCAR and was later criticized since the crash lowered Johnson in the points standings.

The victory was the first in Vickers' career. After the race, Jeff Burton maintained his Drivers' Championship points lead, although that lead decreased significantly because he had a flat tire during the final laps of the race. Chevrolet maintained its lead in the Manufacturers' Championship, 51 points ahead of Dodge and 52 ahead of Ford with six races remaining in the season.

Report

Background
Talladega Superspeedway is one of six superspeedways which host NASCAR races. The standard track is a four-turn,  superspeedway. Its turns are banked 33 degrees, and its front stretch (the location of the finish line) is banked at 16.5 degrees. The back stretch also has a two-degree bank.

Before the race Jeff Burton led the Drivers' Championship with 5,511 points, with Denny Hamlin second and Mark Martin third. Matt Kenseth and Kevin Harvick rounded out the top five and Jeff Gordon, Dale Earnhardt Jr., Jimmie Johnson, Kyle Busch and Kasey Kahne rounded out the top ten drivers competing in the 2006 Chase for the Nextel Cup. In the Manufacturers' Championship, Chevrolet led with 222 points; Ford was second with 175, and Dodge was a close third with 174 points. Dale Jarrett was the race's defending champion.

After the previous race at Talladega (the 2006 Aaron's 499), the track's condition was beginning to deteriorate. Cracks in the third and fourth turns were beginning to cause handling problems with the cars, and a temporary storage unit was built outside the track to accommodate the asphalt needed for resurfacing the track. The entire track, including the skid pad and pit road, was resurfaced,  with the work completed shortly before the 2006 UAW-Ford 500 began.

Practice and qualification
Two 60-minute practice sessions were held the Friday before Sunday's race. In the first session Jeff Gordon was the fastest, ahead of Jarrett in second and Robby Gordon in third. David Gilliland placed fourth and Dave Blaney followed in fifth, with Casey Mears, J. J. Yeley, David Stremme, Brian Vickers and Kurt Busch rounding out the top ten. Later that day, Robby Gordon paced the second session, with Bobby Labonte, Hamlin and Tony Stewart in second, third and fourth place. Blaney duplicated his first-session result in fifth, followed by Yeley, Harvick, Scott Riggs, Ryan Newman and Tony Raines.

Forty-nine cars were entered in the qualifier, although due to NASCAR's qualifying procedure only forty-three could race. Gilliland clinched his first career pole position with a time of 49.950 seconds and was joined on the grid's front row by Jarrett, his Robert Yates Racing teammate. Johnson, Jeff Gordon and Greg Biffle rounded out the top five positions, with Travis Kvapil, Chad Chaffin, Todd Bodine, Hermie Sadler, Kirk Shelmerdine and Kevin Lepage failing to qualify.

Early practice speeds approached . According to Gilliland, "They threw a curveball at us this morning with the restrictor plate and (engine builder) Doug Yates wasn't worried at all. He put the super-tune on it and the thing ran great." Earnhardt called the reduction in speed unnecessary: "The track is safe ... I don't feel (the late change in plate size) is a very fair situation for everybody. Once you're up around the 190s, what's two miles an hour? I don't see what the big deal is. The speed average is up because the corner speed remains better with the new asphalt. As far as running in a straight line, we're no faster than we've always run here." Despite the mandated change, NASCAR did not schedule an additional practice session.

Race
Live television coverage of the race, the 30th of 36 in the 2006 season, began in the United States at 1:00 p.m. Eastern Daylight Time on NBC. Rev. Mike Jackson gave the invocation at 2:20, followed by the 151st Army Band's rendition of the national anthem. The command for the drivers to start their engines was given by Gary Casteel of the UAW, and no driver had to move to the rear of the grid at the start.

The race began at 2:41 p.m. Jarrett passed Gilliland almost immediately to lead the first lap, but lost the lead to Jeff Gordon a lap later. Jamie McMurray passed Gordon for the lead on lap 4; by this time, Gilliland had fallen back to 30th after losing the draft. Three laps later, Gordon regained the lead from McMurray, with drafting assistance from Vickers. On lap 18, McMurray reclaimed the lead from Gordon, and they exchanged the lead again two laps later. On lap 24, McMurray reclaimed the lead, and Kenny Wallace made a pit stop with his car smoking.

On lap 28, Biffle took the lead from McMurray and Earnhardt moved into the top five. Green-flag pit stops were made from laps 30 to 33, with Biffle maintaining his lead. On lap 35, he was passed by Stewart, who lost the lead to Carl Edwards and Kyle Busch two laps later. On the 38th lap, Earnhardt took the lead. Busch passed him on lap 41, with Earnhardt (in the outside lane) dropping back to seventh. On lap 46, Kenseth passed Kyle Busch for the lead, with Kurt Busch and Earnhardt passing Kenseth five laps later.

Earnhardt reclaimed the lead on lap 52, losing it seven laps later to Elliott Sadler. Sadler refueled on the next lap, giving the lead back to Earnhardt. Kenseth took the lead on lap 61, as Earnhardt and others made green-flag pit stops. Kenseth stopped on lap 71 with Biffle and Edwards, with Biffle taking the lead as the pit-stop cycle ended. Lap 72 saw the first caution, as Blaney's left rear tire shredded and he made a pit stop. Biffle, Edwards, and Sterling Marlin stayed out, while the others stopped.

Biffle led the field back up to speed at the restart, and was passed on lap 77 by Jeff Gordon. Three laps later, Sadler made a pit stop with a flat right rear tire. On lap 90 Kyle Busch took the lead, losing it to Gordon on the next lap. McMurray passed Gordon on lap 93, holding the lead for nine laps. Vickers took the lead on lap 102; Earnhardt's left front tire went flat the next lap, costing him a lap. Green-flag pit stops began on lap 107, with Vickers stopping on lap 108 and giving the lead to McMurray. After the pit stops, Vickers regained the lead.

On lap 121, Kyle Busch took the lead, losing it to Jeff Gordon two laps later. Within a lap Gordon lost the draft and fell back to 27th, allowing Kenseth to regain the lead. On lap 127, Clint Bowyer passed Kenseth, holding the lead for two laps until a second yellow flag was displayed due to debris. Hamlin and Michael Waltrip staggered their pit stops, enabling each of them to lead a lap under the caution. Bowyer regained the lead after Waltrip stopped, and the race restarted on lap 134. Kenseth moved back into the lead on the next lap, with Bowyer falling back to tenth.

In a multi-car accident on the first turn on lap 137 Edwards and Mears collided, involving Biffle, Jeff Gordon, Hamlin, Harvick, Marlin, McMurray, Kyle Petty, and Martin Truex Jr. Gordon drove straight to the garage and others made pit stops, giving the lead to Burton. The race restarted on lap 145, during which many drivers topped up with fuel. Kenseth regained the lead; Vickers passed him on lap 147, with Johnson taking the lead a lap later. That lap Reed Sorenson's engine failed, ending his race.

Truex Jr. stayed out of pit road, and led the field to the restart on lap 152 before Johnson passed him a lap later. On lap 154 Paul Menard took the lead, with drafting assistance from Earnhardt, before Johnson regained the lead a lap later. Kahne took the lead on lap 158, losing it to Earnhardt on lap 165. A five-car accident on turn two of lap 173, involving Yeley, Menard, Stewart, Stremme, and Hamlin, prompted the fifth caution; none of the leaders made pit stops during this caution.

The race restarted on lap 178, with Earnhardt leading Johnson and Vickers. That lap, Burton (in fifth) had a flat left rear tire and lost a lap. The field then formed a single line, with most remaining in that formation for the rest of the race. On the final lap, Johnson and Vickers left turn two with Johnson moving out of line to pass Earnhardt. When Vickers tried to move out with Johnson to provide drafting assistance, he clipped Johnson's right rear quarter panel. Johnson then clipped Earnhardt Jr., sending both drivers sliding off the racetrack and into the infield. The yellow flag went out and the field was frozen in place, with the order of finish determined by where the drivers were when the caution began. This gave Vickers the race victory (the first of his career), although he was booed by the crowd.

Post-race comments

Vickers appeared in Victory Lane to celebrate his first career win in front of the crowd, earning $228,850 for the victory. Earnhardt was quick to forgive him for the last-lap accident: "He didn't wreck anyone on purpose. He was trying to push the 48. I don't think he thought, 'Oh, here's my chance to knock them both out.' He just got excited trying to push the 48." Johnson was less sanguine: "We had a great chance to make up some points and got crashed by a teammate ... I was real patient until the white flag was up. I got a good run inside the 8 and got a lot of help from behind — too much help ... Knowing the situation we're all in, I would hope someone would be a little more patient." Johnson's crew chief, Chad Knaus, was annoyed: "I just don't think [Vickers] has the talent to understand what he has underneath him."

Vickers, who would leave Hendrick Motorsports in 2007 for Red Bull Racing Team, said: "I would expect them to be a little upset. Jimmie is my friend, my teammate, and he is running for a championship. But he knows just as well as I do that if I wasn't bump-drafting, he never would have had a shot to pass Junior." Additionally, he denied that he drove more aggressively because he was leaving. Third-place finisher Kurt Busch argued Vickers was in a "Catch-22" situation: "He was trying to help his teammate. It just didn't turn out that way. Vickers was doing the best he could to help the 48. He just didn't anticipate the 8 car blocking as long as he did." Vickers would later receive additional security during the next race weekend.

The result kept Burton in the lead in the Drivers' Championship. After the race, Jeff Gordon (who was involved in the lap-137 accident) was less optimistic about his championship chances: "This pretty much does it for us as far as I'm concerned for the championship. You knew exactly that something like that was going to happen." In the Manufacturers' Championship Chevrolet increased its point total to 231; Dodge moved into second place with 180 and Ford was a close third with 179. The race took three hours, ten minutes and twenty-three seconds to complete; because it ended under caution, no margin of victory was recorded.

Results

Qualifying

Race results

Standings after the race

Note: Only the top ten positions are included for the driver standings. These drivers qualified for the Chase for the Nextel Cup.

References

UAW-Ford 500
UAW-Ford 500
NASCAR races at Talladega Superspeedway
October 2006 sports events in the United States